The philosophy of business considers the fundamental principles that underlie the formation and operation of a business enterprise; the nature and purpose of a business, and the moral obligations that pertain to it.

See also 
 Business ethics
 Theory of the firm

References 
 Drucker, P. (1954) The Practice of Management, HarperBusiness, Reissue edition 1993, 
 Fort, Timothy (2001) Ethics and Governance: Business as Mediating Institution, Oxford University Press USA, New York.
 Friedman, M (1962) Capitalism and Freedom, University of Chicago Press, Chicago, 1962
 Hutcheson, F. (1729) An Inquiry Concerning Morall Good and Evil, 1729.
 Kalin, J. (1968) "In defence of egoism", in Morality and Rational Self-interest, edited by David Gauthier, Prentice Hall, New York, 1970.
 Mandeville, B. (1715) The Fable of the Bees.
 Rawls, J. (1971) A Theory of Justice, Harvard University Press, Cambridge Massachusetts 1971.
  Lord Shaftesbury (1710) Enquiry Concerning Virtue.
 Smith, A. (1759) The Theory of Moral Sentiments, in Adam Smith's Moral and Political Philosophy, edited by H. Schneider, Harper, New York, 1948 and 1970.
 Strasnick, T. (1981) "Neo-utilitarian Ethics and the Ordinal Representation Assumption", in Philosophy in economics, edited by J. Pitt, Reidel Publishing, 1981.
 Luetge C. (ed.) (2013): Handbook of the Philosophical Foundations of Business Ethics. Heidelberg/New York: Springer 2013, .

External links 
 Peter Drucker's web site
 The journal "Philosophy for Business" edited by Geoffrey Klempner
 The journal "Philosophy of Management" founded by Nigel Laurie and edited by Paul Griseri (Managing Editor), Mark Dibben, Ed Freeeman and Frits Schipper

B
Business ethics
Applied philosophy